Tarucani (possibly from Aymara taruja deer, -ni a suffix to indicate ownership, "the one with the deer") is a mountain in the Vilcanota mountain range in the Andes of Peru, about  high. It is situated in the Puno Region, Carabaya Province, Corani District, west of Corani (Qurani). Tarucani lies southeast of the mountain Jachatira east of the large glaciated area of Quelccaya (Quechua for "snow plain").

References 

Mountains of Puno Region
Mountains of Peru